Józef Wielhorski (1759–1817) was a Polish general.

As an officer (rotmistrz) he fought in the Polish–Russian War of 1792 and later, as a colonel, in the Kościuszko Uprising. Tadeusz Kościuszko sent him to revolutionary France with the goal of obtaining help from the Committee of Public Safety, his requests for a French expeditionary corps were however futile. Under Napoleon, he would become (in 1797) a general in the Polish Legions, where he would be taken captive at the Siege of Mantua (1799). As a protest for the French-Austrian peace, he returned to partitioned Poland, but in 1809, with the France again at war with Austria, he would join the pro-French Polish forces and became a general in the Duchy of Warsaw, where he also became a deputy minister of war. He remained in the Duchy during Napoleon's invasion of Russia; in its aftermath, in the Congress Poland, he was a Minister of War and a member of its senate.

Bibliography
 H. P Kosk Generalicja polska t. 2 wytd.: Oficyna Wydawnicza "Ajaks" Pruszków 2001

1759 births
1817 deaths
People from Volyn Oblast
Recipients of the Legion of Honour
Polish generals
People of the Polish–Russian War of 1792
Politicians of the Duchy of Warsaw
Jozef
Generals of the Polish Legions (Napoleonic period)